Vezenkov is a surname. Its female form is Vezenkova.

Notable people with the name include:

 Aleksandar Vezenkov (born 1995), Bulgarian-Cypriot-Greek basketball player
 Stojan Vezenkov (1828–1897), Macedonian Bulgarian builder and activist

Bulgarian-language surnames